Trombidioidea is a superfamily of mites in the order Trombidiformes. There are about 8 families and at least 430 described species in Trombidioidea.

Families
These eight families belong to the superfamily Trombidioidea:
 Eutrombidiidae
 Johnstonianidae
 Microtrombidiidae (micro velvet mites)
 Neothrombiidae
 Neotrombidiidae
 Podothrombidiidae (podothrombidiids)
 Trombiculidae (chiggers)
 Trombidiidae (true velvet mites)

References

Further reading

 
 
 
 
 

Trombidiformes
Arachnid superfamilies